A rebel is a participant in a rebellion.

Rebel or rebels may also refer to:

People
 Rebel (given name)
 Rebel (surname)
 Patriot (American Revolution), during the American Revolution
 American Southerners, as a form of self-identification; see Southern United States
 DJ Rebel (born 1984), or simply Rebel, Belgian DJ
 Johnny Reb, or Johnny Rebel, the national personification of the Southern states of the United States
 In professional wrestling:
Rebel (wrestler), American professional wrestler
 Rockin Rebel, American professional wrestler
 The Rebel, a nickname for American professional wrestler Dick Slater

Organizations and brands
 Rebel (company), a sport equipment retailer in Australia and New Zealand
 Rebel (entertainment complex), an entertainment complex in Toronto, Ontario, Canada
 Rebel (Denmark), a Danish youth organization
 Murphy Rebel, an airplane model by Murphy Aircraft
 REBEL (chess), a chess program
 Rebel (train), a type of train
 Reaching Everyone By Exposing Lies, a New Jersey anti-tobacco program
 Rebels Motorcycle Club, Australia, New Zealand
 Rebels Motorcycle Club (Canada)
 Rebel, a beer brand produced by Havlíčkobrodsko brewery in Havlíčkův Brod, Czech Republic
 Rebel, a brand name of camera; see Canon EOS

Vehicles
 Rambler Rebel automobiles
 AMC Rebel automobiles
 Honda CM series motorcycles

Sports team names
 Berlin Rebels, an American football team from Berlin, Germany
 Dublin Rebels, an American Football team from Dublin, Ireland
 Franklin High School (Tennessee)
 Melbourne Rebels, a rugby union team
 Melbourne Rebels (ARC), a former rugby union team
 Ole Miss Rebels, University of Mississippi
 Port Perry High School, Ontario, Canada
 Saint Louis Priory School, Creve Coeur, Missouri
 Somerset Rebels, the British Speedway Premier league team based in Somerset
 South High School (Bakersfield, California)
 South Burlington High School, Vermont
 UNLV Rebels, University of Nevada, Las Vegas
 Utah Tech University in St George, Utah, formerly called their athletic teams the Rebels, when known as Dixie State University and similar names

Books
 Rebel (novel), a 1969 novel by Bediako Asare
 Rebel Magazine, a British fashion and lifestyle magazine
 Rebel, a 1986 graphic novel by Pepe Moreno
 Rebel, the first book of The Starbuck Chronicles, a series by Bernard Cornwell
 R.E.B.E.L.S., two separate fictional revolutionary paramilitary groups in the DC Comics Universe
 Rebel, a 2019 novel by Marie Lu

Film and television
 Rebel (1985 film), starring Matt Dillon
 Rebel (2012 film), a Telugu action film written and directed by Raghava Lawrence
 Rebel (2014 film), a Canadian short documentary film by Elle-Máijá Tailfeathers
 Rebel (2015 film), a Kannada action film directed by Rajendra Singh Babu
 Rebel (2017 TV series), a 2017 Black Entertainment Television police drama
 Rebel (2021 TV series), a 2021 ABC drama inspired by the life of Erin Brockovich
 Rebel (Iranian TV series), an Iranian TV series made for Filimo's home show service
 Rebel (2022 film), a Belgian film by Adil El Arbi and Bilall Fallah
 "Rebels" (Law & Order), a 1995 episode of Law & Order
 Rebel Without a Cause, a 1955 film which also inspired the name of a character type
 Micah Sanders, also known as Rebel, a character in the TV series Heroes
 Star Wars Rebels, a 2014 animated TV series set in the Star Wars universe
 a member of the Rebel Alliance in the Star Wars universe

Music
 Rebel Records, an American record label

Albums
 Rebel (John Miles album), 1976
 Rebel, album by Buzy (singer) 1989
 Rebels (album), a 2006 RBD album
 Rebel (Lecrae album), 2008
 Rebel (Lynch Mob album), 2015
 Rebels (EP), a 2011 EP by Black Veil Brides

Songs
 "Rebels" (song), a song by Tom Petty and the Heartbreakers from the 1985 album Southern Accents
 "Rebel Rebel", 1974 song by David Bowie
 "Rebel", a song by Bryan Adams from the 1987 album Into the Fire

See also
 The Rebel (disambiguation)
 The Rebels (disambiguation)
 Reb (disambiguation)